The William Brandow House (also known as "The Willows") is a historic house located at 480 Route 385 in Athens, Greene County, New York.

Description and history 
It was built in about 1788 and is a -story, rectangular frame dwelling with a gabled roof. Significant modifications were made in the late 19th century in the Victorian style and early 20th century in the Colonial Revival style. It retains its original Dutch split entry door.

It was listed on the National Register of Historic Places on November 10, 2009.

References

Houses on the National Register of Historic Places in New York (state)
Houses completed in the 18th century
Houses in Greene County, New York
National Register of Historic Places in Greene County, New York